The Ninh Thuận 1 Nuclear Power Plant was a planned nuclear power plant at Phước Dinh in Thuận Nam District, Ninh Thuận Province, Vietnam. Plans for it were cancelled in 2016. It would have consisted of four 1,200 MWe VVER pressurised water reactors. The plant was to be built by Atomstroyexport, a subsidiary of Rosatom.  It would have been owned and operated by state-owned electricity company Vietnam Electricity.  Fuel will have been supplied and used fuel will be reprocessed by Rosatom.  The feasibility study was to be carried out by E4 Group.

The plant would have been built based on a nuclear power development plan, approved by the Vietnamese government in 2007.  In 2009, Vietnam's National Assembly approved a resolution on investment policy for the project.  On 31 October 2010, Vietnamese government and Rosatom signed a construction agreement.

Works to prepare the construction site started in December 2011.  Construction was to start by 2014 and the first unit to be commissioned by 2020. However, in 2014, the Prime Minister  Nguyen Tan Dung announced that the construction would be postponed until 2020 to ensure the highest degree of safety. The construction is financed by the US$8 billion loan from Russia.

See also

 List of nuclear reactors - Vietnam
 Ninh Thuận 2 Nuclear Power Plant
 Nuclear energy in Vietnam
 Nuclear energy policy by country - Vietnam

References

External links
 World-nuclear.org | Nuclear Power in Vietnam

Nuclear power stations in Vietnam
Proposed nuclear power stations
Buildings and structures in Ninh Thuận province
Proposed power stations in Vietnam